The Rider Amphora is the name given to a Melian pithamphora in the National Archaeological Museum, Athens with the inventory number 912. It dates from around 660 BC.

The Rider Amphora belongs to the wider examples of the type. Its name derives from its main image, which recalls that on the somewhat older Horses Amphora: two horses stand opposite each other, with a large palmette between them. However, in this image, a rider sits on each of the horses' backs. Each rider leads another horse with him, using a rope, which is depicted slightly offset behind the rider's horse. Ekschmitt claims that the painter of this amphora does not show the talent of the painter of the Horses Amphora since the bodies of his horses are far too long and as a result the rider appears unnaturally small. Convention apparently forced the painter to adapt his motif to a restricted space. The empty room around this space was filled with various designs inherited from earlier Cycladic art, including the zigzag bands and diamonds. The neck of the amphora is decorated with bulging double palmette volutes, which are separated from one another by vertical bands. On the backside, the painter depicts two riderless horses facing each other. There are no images on the other two sides. The vessel is 90 cm high.

Bibliography 
 Werner Ekschmitt: Kunst und Kultur der Kykladen, Teil II: Geometrische und Archaische Zeit, Mainz am Rhein 1986 (Kulturgeschichte der Antike, Vol. 28.2), pp. 138-139, Tab. 40 

Amphorae
National Archaeological Museum, Athens
Archaeological discoveries in Greece
Horses in art